Ibrahim Al-Ibrahim (born 3 June 1992) is a Saudi football player who plays as a midfielder.

External links 
 

1992 births
Living people
Saudi Arabian footballers
Ettifaq FC players
Khaleej FC players
Hajer FC players
Al-Hejaz Club players
Al-Riyadh SC players
Al-Arabi SC (Saudi Arabia) players
Al Jeel Club players
Saudi Arabia youth international footballers
Saudi First Division League players
Saudi Professional League players
Saudi Second Division players
Association football midfielders
Saudi Arabian Shia Muslims